Daniel Patrick Granville (born 19 January 1975) is an English football coach and former footballer, who is an academy coach for Premier League side Arsenal.

As a player he was a left back who played in the Premier League for Chelsea, Leeds United, Manchester City and Crystal Palace. He also played in the Football League for Cambridge United, Norwich City, Colchester United and Leyton Orient before retiring with non-league side Hemel Hempstead Town. He was capped four times by England U21. Since retiring he has coached football in schools as a PE Teacher and has worked with Arsenal as an academy coach.

Club career

Cambridge United
Granville began his career with Cambridge United, playing 99 games and attracting a number of top clubs.

Chelsea
Granville moved to Chelsea in 1997 for a fee of £300,000, but lost his place in the Chelsea side when Graeme Le Saux was re-signed from Blackburn Rovers. Arguably the highlight of his career occurred during his time at Chelsea, playing in the winning side in the 1998 UEFA Cup Winners' Cup triumph over VfB Stuttgart. It was earlier in that campaign that Granville scored his only Chelsea goal, against Slovan Bratislava.

Leeds United
He was signed by Leeds United in the summer of 1998 for £1,600,000.

Manchester City
Following a successful loan spell at Manchester City in November 1999 Granville moved again, joining City permanently for £1,000,000. He helped the club gain promotion to the Premier League, another highlight of his career. Towards the end of time at Manchester City, he was pushed onto the bench and spent a month on loan at Norwich City, a successful spell after which Norwich asked for his signature. He opted to return to City to help the club retain their Premier League status.

Crystal Palace
In December 2001 Granville signed for Crystal Palace and played regularly in the first team. Danny was an integral part of the play-off-winning team of 2003–04, scoring three goals and recording many assists. Granville made 138 appearances for Crystal Palace.

Later career
Granville signed with Colchester United at the start of the 2007–08 season and was given the number 2 shirt. He was released by the club at the end of the season.

After being released from Colchester, Granville signed for Leyton Orient on 4 June 2008. His stay lasted less than a year as, after only 15 first team appearances and one goal (against Bradford in the FA Cup) he was released by Orient manager Geraint Williams on 4 May 2009. Williams had also been the manager at Colchester when the Essex club released Granville the previous year.

Granville signed for Hemel Hempstead Town in October 2009 after being released by Leyton Orient.

International career
Granville represented England at under-21 level.

Coaching career
After retiring as a player, Granville worked as a coach with Arsenal's academy and coached in school football.

Personal life
Granville works as a Games Teacher at Duncombe School in Hertfordshire.

Honours
 European Cup Winners Cup: 1998
 Football League First Division: 2002

References

External links
 
 
 Danny Granville – Career information Flown from the Nest
 Player profile Colchester United
 

1975 births
Footballers from Islington (district)
Living people
Association football defenders
English footballers
England under-21 international footballers
Cambridge United F.C. players
Chelsea F.C. players
Leeds United F.C. players
Manchester City F.C. players
Norwich City F.C. players
Crystal Palace F.C. players
Colchester United F.C. players
Leyton Orient F.C. players
Hemel Hempstead Town F.C. players
Premier League players
English Football League players
Arsenal F.C. non-playing staff